Slovakia competed at the 2012 Summer Paralympics in London, United Kingdom from August 29 to September 9, 2012.

Medalists

Archery

Athletics

Boccia

Individual events

Pairs events

Cycling

Powerlifting

Shooting

Swimming

Table tennis

Wheelchair tennis

See also
 Slovakia at the Paralympics
 Slovakia at the 2012 Summer Olympics

References

Nations at the 2012 Summer Paralympics
2012
2012 in Slovak sport